The Real Life Amphitheater is  an open-air amphitheater, located in Selma, Texas.

In 2001 it was opened as the Verizon Wireless Amphitheater. It closed in 2009 due to a lack of performances.

Its overall capacity is 20,000, with 6,000 seated and approximately 14,000 on the lawn, and has more than 4,200 parking spaces.

The facility was purchased by River City Community Church in 2011 and hosts a wide variety of entertainment and community outreach events.

History
The facility was opened in 2001 by Clear Channel Entertainment. That company's successor, Live Nation, put the facility on the market in 2007 and sold it to a Dallas-based real estate company, Stream Realty, in 2009. The sale included a 7-year restriction against its continuing use as a concert venue.

After initially considering redevelopment, Stream Realty decided to market the property for resale. Later that year, a large local church, River City Community Church, entered into a contract to buy the facility, but had to cancel the transaction (and forfeit a deposit) after failing to find financing. However, the property remained on the market, and in 2011 River City Community Church was successful in its renewed effort to buy the facility. The church commenced renovation of the facility and reopened for shows in November 2019 under the new name.

Concerts

See also
 List of contemporary amphitheatres

References

External links
[River City Community Church, www.reallife.org]
https://web.archive.org/web/20090304034321/http://www.mysanantonio.com/business/local/Live_Nation_sells_Verizon_Amphitheater.html

Amphitheaters in the United States
Verizon Wireless